Tōyako may refer to:

Lake Tōya, known as "Tōyako" in Japanese, a volcanic caldera lake in Shikotsu-Toya National Park, Abuta District, Iburi Subprefecture, Hokkaidō, Japan
Tōyako, Hokkaidō, a town in Abuta District, Iburi Subprefecture, Hokkaidō, Japan